Josh Fields is the name of:

Josh Fields (infielder) (born 1982), player in the Philadelphia Phillies organization
Josh Fields (pitcher) (born 1985), relief pitcher for the Los Angeles Dodgers

See also
Joshua Field (disambiguation)